Benoît Boulanger (born September 12, 1985) is a former professional Canadian football fullback for the Montreal Alouettes of the Canadian Football League. He was drafted by the Alouettes in the fifth round of the 2009 CFL Draft. He played CIS football for the Sherbrooke Vert et Or. The Alouettes announced his retirement on June 24, 2009 and he is expected to return to the Vert et Or.

References

External links
Sherbrooke Vert et Or bio

1985 births
Living people
Sportspeople from Sherbrooke
French Quebecers
Canadian football running backs
Sherbrooke Vert et Or football players
Montreal Alouettes players